Wayne Harris (born 1938) is a retired American football player.

Wayne Harris may also refer to:

Wayne Harris (Canadian jockey) (born c. 1948), retired Canadian jockey
Wayne Harris (Australian jockey) (born 1960), Australian jockey
Wayne Harris Jr. (born 1959), former Canadian football linebacker and head coach of the Calgary Dinos